Oscar and Lucinda is a 1997 British-Australian romantic drama film directed by Gillian Armstrong and starring Cate Blanchett, Ralph Fiennes, Ciarán Hinds and Tom Wilkinson. It is based on the 1988 Booker Prize-winning novel Oscar and Lucinda by Peter Carey. In March 1998, the film was nominated at the 70th Academy Awards for the Best Costume Design.

Plot
As a little girl living in Australia, Lucinda Leplastrier is given a Prince Rupert's Drop which sparks a lifelong obsession with glass.

Lucinda's parents die and she is left a wealthy heiress after her guardians sell off the vast farmland that was her family's home. She buys a glass factory with her money and takes to gambling after her accountant introduces her to it.

Meanwhile, a young Oscar is being reared as a Plymouth Brother by his father but after receiving a sign from God he decides to join the Anglican faith. While studying, he is introduced to gambling and becomes highly successful, using his winnings to fund his studies and giving the rest to the poor. He earns a scholarship to study in New South Wales. On the boat over, he meets Lucinda and hears her confess to gambling, which he denies is a sin. They play cards together until Oscar becomes panicked at the sight of a storm.

In New South Wales, Oscar loses his scholarship after he is unable to stop gambling. He goes to live with Lucinda who allows him to work in her glass factory. Inspired by a model of a glass church she shows him, he asks her to make a real life replica to send to their mutual friend the Revered Dennis Hasset, betting that he can deliver it by Good Friday. Lucinda decides that they will each bet their inheritance.

Because he fears water, Oscar takes the church over land in an expedition led by Mr. Jeffries. He witnesses Jeffries murdering and raping Indigenous Australians and eventually kills him in self-defence after Jeffries attacks him.

He is successful in delivering the church. Weakened upon arrival, he is left in the care of a woman named Miriam Chadwick, who rapes him. Fearing that he will have to marry Miriam, and in love with Lucinda, Oscar enters the glass church to pray. He falls asleep and is drowned inside when the church, which was resting on a barge in the water, sinks.

As Miriam is pregnant with Oscar's child, Hasset burns the papers confirming the wager, not wanting Lucinda's money to be inherited by her. She dies shortly after her son, Oscar, is born and the child is reared by Lucinda.

Cast

 Ralph Fiennes as Oscar Hopkins
 Cate Blanchett as Lucinda Leplastrier
 Ciarán Hinds as the Reverend Dennis Hasset
 Tom Wilkinson as Hugh Stratton
 Richard Roxburgh as Mr. Jeffries
 Clive Russell as Theophilius
 Bille Brown as Percy Smith
 Josephine Byrnes as Miriam Chadwick
 Barnaby Kay as Wardley-Fish
 Barry Otto as Jimmy D'Abbs
 Linda Bassett as Betty Stratton
 Peter Whitford as Mr. Ahearn
 Geoffrey Rush as Narrator
 Adam Hayes as Young Oscar
 James Tingey as 13 year-old Oscar
 Polly Cheshire as Young Lucinda

Production
Gillian Armstrong had long wanted to film Peter Carey's novel but the rights were originally bought for John Schlesinger. However, after several years they could not come up with a script anyone was happy with; Schlesinger dropped out, Armstrong became involved and she brought in Laura Jones.

Filming
Filming took place in Sydney (as well in the Sydney suburbs of Glebe and Randwick) and all around New South Wales. Scenes were also filmed in Hobart, Tasmania, and some others in Cornwall, south-west England.

Music
The soundtrack to Oscar and Lucinda was released by CBS Masterworks Records on 9 December 1997 in Australia and the United States, it was recorded by Thomas Newman and the Bruckner Orchestra. The soundtrack was completely recorded at Paramount Scoring Stage and at The Village Recorder, in Los Angeles, California on 9–30 June 1997. The music from the track “Sydney Harbor” would eventually appear in a teaser trailer for Wall-E, another movie that Thomas Newman will conduct the score for.

Release

Box office
Oscar and Lucinda grossed $1,768,946 at the box office in Australia, which is equivalent to $2,458,835 in 2009 dollars. The film grossed $4,953,510 between USA, Australia, UK and Germany.

Reception
Oscar and Lucinda received generally positive reviews from critics.

Awards

See also
 Cinema of Australia

References

External links
 
 
 
 
Oscar and Lucinda at Oz Movies

1997 films
Australian romantic drama films
British romantic drama films
1990s French-language films
Fox Searchlight Pictures films
Films directed by Gillian Armstrong
Films based on Australian novels
Films set in the 19th century
Films set in colonial Australia
1997 romantic drama films
Films scored by Thomas Newman
British historical romance films
American romantic drama films
Australian historical romance films
1990s English-language films
1990s American films
1990s British films